General William Frederick Forster KH (17 December 1798 – 8 June 1879) was a senior British Army officer who served as Military Secretary from 1860 to 1871.

Military career
Brought up in Berwick-upon-Tweed, Forster was commissioned into the 85th Regiment of Foot in 1813. In 1830 he was appointed Groom of the Bedchamber for the Duke of Gloucester.

He became Deputy Adjutant-General in Ireland in 1854. He was appointed Deputy Adjutant-General in 1855, and then Military Secretary in 1860, retiring from that post in 1871. He was promoted to general in 1874.

Forster was also Colonel of the 81st Regiment of Foot. He died in 1879.

References

 

1798 births
1879 deaths
British Army generals
85th Regiment of Foot (Bucks Volunteers) officers
81st Regiment of Foot officers
People from Berwick-upon-Tweed